"I'm Henery the Eighth, I Am" (also "I'm Henery the VIII, I Am" or "I'm Henry VIII, I Am"; spelled "Henery" but pronounced "'Enery" in the Cockney style normally used to sing it) is a 1910 British music hall song by Fred Murray and R. P. Weston. It was a signature song of the music hall star Harry Champion.

Joe Brown included the song on his first album A Picture of You in 1962. But in 1965, it became the fastest-selling song in history to that point when it was revived  by Herman's Hermits, becoming the group's second number-one on the Billboard Hot 100 chart, dethroning "(I Can't Get No) Satisfaction". Despite that success, the single was not released in the UK. The song is one of the shortest (in length) number one singles of all time in the US.

In the well-known chorus, Henery explains that his wife had been married seven times before, each time to another Henery:
I'm 'Enery the Eighth, I am,
'Enery the Eighth I am, I am!
I got married to the widow next door,
She's been married seven times before
And every one was an 'Enery
She wouldn't have a Willie nor a Sam
I'm her eighth old man named 'Enery
'Enery the Eighth, I am!

However, in the Hermits' version, Peter Noone ends each chorus with "I'm her eighth old man, I'm 'Enery" and never sings "named".

Harry Champion version 
According to one source, Champion "used to fire off [the chorus] at tremendous speed with almost desperate gusto, his face bathed in sweat and his arms and legs flying in all directions." In later versions recorded by Champion, "Willie" is changed to "William" because the former is a British slang term for "penis."

Joe Brown version 
In 1961, this song was recorded and extensively performed live by the British star Joe Brown, who revived the song and made it largely known in the British pop world. His version has two choruses either side of his guitar solo (B-side, Piccadilly Records 7N 35005). George Harrison was a fan of Brown's and sang the song as part of the Beatles' early repertoire. The group never recorded their version. To the present day, Brown often performs it in concert.

Herman's Hermits version 
The rock and roll stylings of the song gave Herman's Hermits their second US number one hit; as with the Brown arrangement, it contains only the chorus (and none of the three verses) of the original. As a result, the tune is a mere one minute and fifty seconds long, one of the shortest-ever songs to top the Billboard singles chart. In their short and fast take of the song, the guitar and bass are considered proto-punk and were a direct influence on the Ramones,  (indeed the song "Judy Is A Punk" includes the line "Second verse, same as the first" as in the Hermits' tune.) The speedy guitar work at the break by lead guitarist Derek Leckenby evokes Chuck Berry sonically (e. g. “Johnny B. Goode”) then memorably shifts into quoting the melody.  Billboard praised the song's "strong dance beat and vocal performance."

They performed the song on Hullabaloo as well as The Ed Sullivan Show. This version was also performed on the third season premiere of The Jimmy Dean Show with Jimmy Dean and Jim Henson's Rowlf the Dog wearing wigs, three months after Herman's performance on Sullivan.

Chart history

Weekly charts

Year-end charts

Other versions 
Connie Francis recorded a version for her 1966 album Connie Francis and The Kids Next Door.

Title and lyrics 
The song is traditionally sung in a Cockney accent. Earlier sources usually spell the name "Henery" (as do some old sources when referring to the historical King of England and Ireland), and the music requires the name "Henery" (or "'Enery") to be pronounced as three syllables. The sheet music for the 1965 Herman's Hermits revival, however, presented the name as "Henry", as do sources referring to this version.

In the Herman's Hermits version, the band sings the lyrics three times. Between the first two choruses, Peter Noone calls out, "Second verse, same as the first!". The background singers on the version recorded by Connie Francis use this call as well.

In popular culture 
 In the 1990 film Ghost, Sam (Patrick Swayze) sings this song on a continuous run in a bad Cockney London accent all night long, to Oda Mae Brown (Whoopi Goldberg) to annoy her into helping him.
 Homer Simpson - in the persona of Henry VIII - sings a parody of this song in The Simpsons 2004 episode "Margical History Tour", with the lyrics referencing Henry's voracious appetite.
 Alvin and the Chipmunks covered this song.
 The original Harry Champion version of the song was used as the titles music of The Libertines 2012 music documentary There Are No Innocent Bystanders.

See also
 Henry VIII
Cultural depictions of Henry VIII

References

External links
 I'm Henery the Eighth MP3 download of Harry Champion's 1911 recording at Internet Archive
 I'm Henery the Eighth, I Am lyrics at Wikisource

Herman's Hermits songs
1910 songs
1965 singles
Billboard Hot 100 number-one singles
Cashbox number-one singles
Comedy songs
Cultural depictions of Henry VIII
Novelty songs
Music hall songs
Songs written by R. P. Weston